Alexander Borodich (Russian: Алекса́ндр Борóдич; born July 28, 1975) is a Russian venture investor, serial entrepreneur, digital media strategist. Borodich is the former marketing director at Mail.ru Group. Borodich was recognized as “the business angel of year 2016," in 2016. Borodich is a private investor, the founder of the Universa blockchain platform, managing partner of marketing communication agency FutureAction, the founder of FutureLabs Future Laboratory and the VentureClub.ru investor club, a crowd-investment platform and an investor club. He is the former principal of Economic School at Moscow State University (2010-2013), and current Chairman of the Scientific Research & Innovative Technologies Commission at International Aerospace Committee.

Education 
In 1999, Borodich graduated from Moscow State Institute of Electronics and Mathematics, where in 2003 he graduated from graduate school.

He holds master's degree from National Research University Higher School of Economics, Department of Marketing.

In 2008, Borodich received MBA at Stockholm School of Economics.

Career start 
Alexander Borodich started his career as a project manager and a web-architect at Intel in 1999. In 2000, he joined ThinkWave as a web-developer. In 2002, he held the position of Head of e-commerce at the research and consulting company DirectInfo.

From 2003 to 2005, Borodich was doing online marketing at MAR Consult, while working at his own project called ViralMeter, a viral marketing tracking service. From 2005 to 2009, he was a Marketing Director at Acronis, USA, where he created and managed the online marketing communication worldwide and launched a large number of successful digital campaigns.

In 2009–2010, Borodich directed all online marketing initiatives at Mail.ru Group as a Marketing Director. He negotiated new key partnerships with MTS, Beeline, Microsoft, while leading all media campaigns for Mail.ru. In 2010, Borodich becomes Director General at Rumart.ru, where he works until 2011, before becoming a co-founder and CEO at Glomper.

In 2019, Borodich was elected as Chairman of the Commission for Scientific Research and Innovative Technologies of the International Aerospace Committee

Entrepreneurship 
In 2003–2005, while working for different companies, Borodich was developing his own project ViralMeter, a service for monitoring viral marketing activity.

In 2012, Borodich co-founded MyWishBoard.com, a service for creating wish lists that can be shared with friends through social networks.

Since 2013 - Managing Partner and Lecturer at FutureLabs and FutureAction.

Current activities 
Borodich is the founder of Future Labs, a platform with the focus on investing in third-party projects along with developing their projects through attracting investors' funds.

Borodich is Member of the Administrative Council of the National Association of Business Angels.

He is Managing partner at VentureClub, a crowdfunding platform and an investors club, and Managing partner at the digital marketing agency FutureAction.

Besides the entrepreneurship activities, he holds the position of Chairman of the Scientific Research & Innovative Technologies Commission at International Aerospace Committee.

Teaching activity 
In 2003, Borodich started lecturing at Moscow State University. Soon after, he was appointed the Head of Economics School there (2003-2013). Currently, Borodich is a teacher at National Research University Higher School of Economics and a lecturer at Moscow State University. He is a regular speaker at professional conferences in the industry.

Borodich was a lecturer at Moscow State University and the head of Economics and Mathematics School at Moscow State University from 2010 to 2013.

Professional recognition 
In 2012, Borodich was granted a patent in the USA on assessing the effectiveness of information dissemination in social networks (published in 2012).

The same year, he became one of the winners at MobileBeat Innovation Competition, 2012 (San Francisco).

In 2015, Russian Venture Capital (RVC), a government fund of funds and the development institute of the Russian Federation, named Borodich Russia's most active business angel of the year. In 2016, the Russian National Business Angels Association recognized Borodich as Russia's "business angel of the year" at a ceremony at the Skolkovo Hypercube.

References 

1975 births
Living people
Russian businesspeople
Venture capitalists
Businesspeople in telecommunications
Academic staff of Moscow State University